Grimnes is a surname. Notable people with the surname include:

Bjørn Grimnes (born 1950), Norwegian javelin thrower 
Ole Kristian Grimnes (born 1937), Norwegian historian

See also
Grimes (surname)

Norwegian-language surnames